= Laura Wegener Parfrey =

Academic background
- Education: BS, 2004, University at Albany, SUNY; PhD, 2011, University of Massachusetts Amherst
- Thesis: Diversity of Eukaryotes and Their Genomes (2011)

Laura Wegener Parfrey is a Canadian bioscientist, focusing on microbial ecology. As of 2014, she is a Canada Research Chair in Protist Ecology at the University of British Columbia.

Her work has two distinct strands: the microbial ecology of the mammalian gut and coastal microbial ecosystems.

== Career ==
Wegener Parfrey earned her Bachelor of Science degree in 2004 from the University at Albany, SUNY and her PhD in 2011 from the University of Massachusetts Amherst, with a thesis entitled Diversity of Eukaryotes and Their Genomes
